The Good Soldier Schweik is a 1955 Czechoslovak animated film directed by Jiří Trnka based on the novel The Good Soldier Švejk by Jaroslav Hašek. Its length is 76 minutes and consists of three episodes, From Hatvan to Halič, Švejk train accidents and Švejk Budějovice anabasi. Narrator: Jan Werich.

External links

1955 films
1955 animated films
Czechoslovak animated films
1950s Czech-language films
Czech animated films
Films directed by Jiří Trnka
Films based on Czech novels
Films based on works by Jaroslav Hašek
The Good Soldier Švejk
World War I films set on the Eastern Front
Animated films based on novels
Czech war comedy films
1950s war comedy films
Film remakes
Czech World War I films
Czech animated comedy films